Holbeinpferd is the colloquial name of the sculpture of a horse (in German: Pferd) in the suburb Wiehre in Freiburg im Breisgau in Baden-Württemberg, Germany which is standing at the corner of Günterstal and Holbein streets. The concrete sculpture of a foal was created in 1936 by the sculptor Werner Gürtner. It is 1.90 m both long and high and weighs nearly 1 tonne.

It became famous for the fact that since about 1980 it is frequently painted at night.

References

External links

 Galleries of photos on the website of Holbein-Pferd
 Atlas Obscura: Holbein Horse

1936 establishments in Germany
1936 sculptures
Animal sculptures in Germany
Buildings and structures in Freiburg im Breisgau
Concrete sculptures in Germany
Horses in art
Outdoor sculptures in Germany
Tourist attractions in Freiburg im Breisgau
Sculptures in Baden-Württemberg